Smeh za leseno pregrado is a novel by Slovenian author Jani Virk. It was first published in 2000.

See also
List of Slovenian novels

References
Smeh za leseno pregrado, Knjigarna-beletrina.com, accessed 19 July 2012

Slovenian novels
2000 novels